The Ohio Valley Conference women's basketball tournament is the conference championship tournament in women's basketball for the Ohio Valley Conference. It is a single-elimination tournament involving 8 of the 10 league schools, and seeding is based on regular-season records with head-to-head matchup as a tiebreaker. The winner receives the conference's automatic bid to the NCAA women's basketball tournament. The highest seeds face off against the corresponding lowest seeds, with the two remaining teams facing off in the Finals to determine the champion. The tournament has been held since 1981.

History
For the 1978-79 season, a tournament was held to determine the champion of the conference, though it was not a postseason tournament due to it being held from February 8–10, with the season running until March 9. Southeast Missouri vacated the 2005-06 title due to NCAA penalties. Tennessee Tech has won 9 titles, Austin Peay (which leaves the conference in July 2022) has won 7, and Belmont (also leaving in July 2022) and Middle Tennessee (formerly of the conference) have won 6 each.

Results

List of championships by school

 Schools highlighted in pink are former members of the Ohio Valley Conference

See also
 Ohio Valley Conference men's basketball tournament

References